Wesley "Wes" Wilkinson (born 1 May 1984) is an English footballer who played as a midfielder in the Football League for Oldham Athletic.

Career
Wilkinson was born in Manchester and began his career with in the youth team at Altrincham and then with Nantwich Town before he joined Oldham Athletic in March 2004. He made six appearances in the Football League for the Latics before he was released in May 2005. After leaving Oldham, Wilkinson re-entered non-league football playing for a host of clubs in the near to the Manchester area including Woodley Sports, Leigh RMI, Ashton United, Newcastle Town, Trafford, Irlam and New Mills. In August 2013 he joined Staffordshire club Kidsgrove Athletic.

References

External links

1984 births
Living people
English footballers
Association football forwards
English Football League players
Altrincham F.C. players
Nantwich Town F.C. players
Oldham Athletic A.F.C. players
Stockport Sports F.C. players
Leigh Genesis F.C. players
Ashton United F.C. players
Newcastle Town F.C. players
Trafford F.C. players
Irlam F.C. players
New Mills A.F.C. players
Kidsgrove Athletic F.C. players
Northern Premier League players